Lady Lake is a town in Lake County, Florida, United States. The population was 13,926 at the 2010 census. As of 2019, the population recorded by the U.S. Census Bureau is 16,020. It is part of the Orlando–Kissimmee–Sanford Metropolitan Statistical Area. Area history is exhibited at the Lady Lake Historical Society Museum.

Geography

Demographics

At the 2000 census there were 11,828 people, 6,125 households, and 4,293 families in the town. The racial makeup of the town was 95.32% White, 3.24% African American, 0.20% Native American, 0.31% Asian, 0.06% Pacific Islander, 0.37% from other races, and 0.50% from two or more races. Hispanic or Latino of any race were 1.83%.

Of the 6,125 households 7.1% had children under the age of 18 living with them, 64.0% were married couples living together, 4.8% had a female householder with no husband present, and 29.9% were non-families. 26.5% of households were one person and 20.9% were one person aged 65 or older.  The average household size was 1.91 and the average family size was 2.22.

The age distribution was 7.7% under the age of 18, 2.1% from 18 to 24, 8.8% from 25 to 44, 20.6% from 45 to 64, and 60.8% 65 or older.  The median age was 68 years old. For every 100 females, there were 86.5 males.  For every 100 females age 18 and over, there were 85.7 males.

The median household income was $32,581 and the median family income  was $37,887. Males had a median income of $22,043 versus $18,450 for females. The per capita income for the town was $21,337.  About 5.2% of families and 8.4% of the population were below the poverty line, including 39.1% of those under age 18 and 2.8% of those age 65 or over.

Parks and recreation

The town operates the Lady Lake Community Building, which may be used for public events.

Education

Lake County Schools operates public schools in Lady Lake. The Villages Elementary School of Lady Lake, which serves the town, opened in 1999. Carver Middle School  in Leesburg and Leesburg High School also serve Lady Lake.

The Lady Lake Public Library is located at 225 Guava Street.

References

External links
 Town of Lady Lake official site

Towns in Lake County, Florida
Greater Orlando
Towns in Florida